The Jean-Lesage generating station, (French: Centrale Jean-Lesage) formerly known as Manic-2, is a dam located 22 km from Baie-Comeau built on Manicouagan River in Quebec, Canada.  It was constructed between 1961 and 1967. On June 22, 2010, the dam and the generating station were renamed in honour of Jean Lesage, who was premier of Quebec during the construction of the complex.

Dam
Jean-Lesage is a gravity dam "hollow type" with a spillway made of concrete. The reservoir starts at the base of Manic-3.

Construction and commissioning
Construction started on October 24, 1961. From June 2 to December 8, 1962, diversion tunnels were driven through the mountain to divert the river's flow around the construction site. The cofferdam that forced the water to use the diversion tunnels was completed on July 30, 1963, construction of the dam started the day after. By autumn 1965, the dam and powerhouse were sufficiently complete to put the first group of five turbines into service, the others were put in service at the end of construction. Commissioning was completed in 1967.

Tourism
It is possible to visit the complex during summer between the end of June and start of September. The 90-minute visit consists of a guided tour by Hydro-Quebec which lets the visitor enter cavities of the dam and see a turbine in action within the powerhouse.

See also 

 List of largest power stations in Canada
 Manic-3
 Daniel-Johnson Dam
 Manicouagan Reservoir

References

External links 
 Pictures and information from Hydro-Quebec
 Information on guided tour

Energy infrastructure completed in 1967
Manicouagan-Outardes hydroelectric project
Run-of-the-river power stations